ADP-ribosylation factor-like protein 8B is a protein that in humans is encoded by the ARL8B gene.

References

External links

Further reading